Journey into Darkness is a 1968 British made-for-television horror film featuring two episodes derived from the 1968–1969 anthology television series Journey to the Unknown starring Robert Reed and Jennifer Hilary, directed by Peter Sasdy and James Hill. The film contains the following episodes:

"Paper Dolls" (original broadcast: November 7, 1968 on ABC)
"The New People" (original broadcast: November 14, 1968 on ABC)

Patrick McGoohan is featured as host in a dark room setting who introduces the two episodes.

Plot

"The New People"
A young American couple moves to New England and learns that everyone in their new neighborhood belongs to a cult which has chosen them as sacrifices. Based upon a story by Charles Beaumont.

Director: Peter Sasdy
Written by: Oscar Millard
Cast: Robert Reed (Hank Prentiss), Jennifer Hilary (Anne Prentiss), Patrick Allen (Luther Ames)

"Paper Dolls"
A set of quadruplets are telepathically connected as they feel one another's pain and share skills and talents. Based upon a story by L.P. Davies.

Director: James Hill
Written by: John Gould
Cast: Michael Tolan (Craig Miller), Nanette Newman (Jill Collins), Barnaby and Roderick Shaw (Richard and Rodney)

References

External links

Patrick McGoohan segment introductions at YouTube

1968 television films
1968 films
1968 horror films
British television films
British horror films
British anthology films
British horror anthology films
Hammer Film Productions films
Films edited from television programs
Films directed by James Hill (British director)
Films directed by Peter Sasdy
1960s English-language films
1960s British films